Lampros Fountoulis (born 23 January 1961) is a Greek politician, representing the far right Golden Dawn party. He was a Member of the European Parliament (MEP) from Greece from 2014 until 2019.

References

1961 births
Living people
MEPs for Greece 2014–2019
Golden Dawn (political party) politicians
Politicians from Athens